Scinax humilis is a species of frog in the family Hylidae.
It is endemic to Brazil.
Its natural habitats are subtropical or tropical moist lowland forests, subtropical or tropical moist montane forests, swamps, intermittent freshwater marshes, and heavily degraded former forest.
It is threatened by habitat loss.

References
 

humilis
Endemic fauna of Brazil
Amphibians described in 1954
Taxonomy articles created by Polbot
Taxobox binomials not recognized by IUCN